Xiao Yuncong (1596–1673) was a famed Chinese landscape painter, calligrapher, and poet during the late Ming and early Qing dynasties.

Xiao was born in Wuhu in Anhui province, at that time part of Taiping Prefecture. His style name was 'Chimu' and his pseudonym was 'Wumen Daoren'. Later in life he acquired the pseudonyms 'Zhongshan Laoren' and 'Anhui Wuhuren'. Xiao was known for his landscape paintings such as the Taiping shanshui tuhua which used dry and twisting brushstrokes called gui shu pai. He did not follow any previous artist's style. In calligraphy, he produced the work Mei Hua Tang Posthumous manuscript. He remained a lifelong Ming dynasty supporter.

Notes

References
 Barnhart, R. M. et al. (1997). Three thousand years of Chinese painting. New Haven, Yale University Press. 
 (In Chinese) Ci hai bian ji wei yuan hui. Ci Hai Encyclopedic Dictionary. Shanghai: Shanghai ci shu chu ban she, 1979.

1596 births
1673 deaths
Ming dynasty landscape painters
Qing dynasty landscape painters
People from Wuhu
Painters from Anhui
Ming dynasty calligraphers
Qing dynasty calligraphers
17th-century Chinese calligraphers